Antiopi Melidoni (born October 11, 1977) is a Greek water polo player and Olympic silver medalist.

She received a silver medal at the 2004 Summer Olympics in 2004 Athens with the Greek women's national team.

See also
 List of Olympic medalists in water polo (women)
 List of world champions in women's water polo
 List of World Aquatics Championships medalists in water polo

References

External links
 

1977 births
Living people
Greek female water polo players
Olympic water polo players of Greece
Water polo players at the 2004 Summer Olympics
Olympic silver medalists for Greece
Olympic medalists in water polo
Medalists at the 2004 Summer Olympics
World Aquatics Championships medalists in water polo
Water polo players from Athens
21st-century Greek women